Revenge of the East Frisians is a 1974 West German sex comedy film directed by Walter Boos. It is a loose sequel to the 1973 film The East Frisian Report.

Cast
 Alexandra Bogojevic as Elke Harms
 Elke Deuringer as Luise Pfannenstiel
 Florian Endlicher as Klaus Berger
 Helga Feddersen as Frau Brünitz
 Peter Hamm as Tonino
 Horst Hesslein as Herr Eppo - Wirt
 Gerda-Maria Jürgens as Frieda Harms
 Karl-Heinz Kreienbaum as Jan Harms
 Josef Moosholzer as Alfred Pfannenstiel - Direktor
 Gaby Steiner as Heike
 Jasper Vogt as Hein Harms

References

Bibliography 
 Annette Miersch. Schulmädchen-Report: der deutsche Sexfilm der 70er Jahre. Bertz, 2003.

External links 
 

1974 films
1970s sex comedy films
German sex comedy films
West German films
1970s German-language films
Films directed by Walter Boos
1974 comedy films
1970s German films